Persidi stands for Persatuan Sepakbola Idi (en: Football Association of Idi). Persidi Idi is an  Indonesian football club based in Idi Rayeuk, East Aceh Regency, Aceh. They play in Liga 3.

Honours
 Liga 3 Aceh
 Champion: 2019

References

External links
 
Liga-Indonesia.co.id

Football clubs in Indonesia
Football clubs in Aceh
Association football clubs established in 1980
1980 establishments in Indonesia